Rivula niveipuncta is a species of moth of the family Noctuidae. It is found in Asia, including India and Taiwan.

References

Moths described in 1905
Hypeninae
Moths of Asia